Rod Davis (born April 2, 1981) is a professional gridiron football linebacker who is currently a free agent. He was selected in the fifth round of the 2004 NFL Draft by the Minnesota Vikings. He played college football for the Southern Mississippi Golden Eagles.

Davis has played for the Carolina Panthers, Philadelphia Soul, Edmonton Eskimos, Montreal Alouettes, and Calgary Stampeders.

Early years
He went on to play at Central Junior High and Gulfport High School where he played for the Admirals, before he went to for Southern Mississippi. In 2002, he won the Conerly Trophy as the best college football player in the state of Mississippi.

College career
While at Southern Mississippi, Davis recorded four interceptions. Was selected as a First-team All-CUSA as a sophomore and junior. During his junior year, he had career-highs with 122 tackles and 10.5 sacks, he was also selected as the Conference USA defensive player of the year and a Third-team All-American. He finished his college career with 526 tackles and 18.5 sacks.

Professional career

National Football League
Davis has played in 40 career NFL games with the Minnesota Vikings and Carolina Panthers, recording 43 tackles with one forced fumble.

In 2004, he played in 14 games and had nine tackles. In 2005 Davis played in 16 games and had 21 tackles and one forced fumble. Davis joined the Panthers and began 2006, with Carolina playing in one game and recording one tackle. He then re-joined the Vikings and played in nine games and recorded 12 tackles.

Arena Football League
Davis joined the Philadelphia Soul of the Arena Football League in 2008 and won his first professional championship when the Soul won ArenaBowl XXII over the San Jose SaberCats.

Canadian Football League
Davis signed with the Edmonton Eskimos on May 6, 2009 and played through the 2011 season. His first start came on August 13, 2009, following injuries to Mark Restelli and to Maurice Lloyd.

After becoming a free agent on February 15, 2012, Davis signed with the Montreal Alouettes on February 16, 2012. After playing only one season with the Alouettes, he was released on February 13, 2013.

On February 25, 2013, Davis signed with the Calgary Stampeders of the Canadian Football League.

References
Sources
 ESPN: Chat with Philadelphia Soul LB Rod Davis - SportsNation

Notes

External links
 
 Profile at NFL.com
 Minnesota Vikings profile at Yahoo! Sports
 Minnesota Vikings profile at ESPN.com

1981 births
Living people
American players of Canadian football
Canadian football linebackers
American football linebackers
African-American players of American football
Minnesota Vikings players
Carolina Panthers players
Philadelphia Soul players
Edmonton Elks players
Montreal Alouettes players
Calgary Stampeders players
Southern Miss Golden Eagles football players
Players of American football from Mississippi
21st-century African-American sportspeople
20th-century African-American people